On 24 December 2020, Boko Haram attacked Pemi, a mostly-Christian village in Borno State, northeastern Nigeria. The jihadists arrived in trucks and on motorcycles, shooting at villagers. The insurgents killed at least seven people and kidnapped a priest. The militants burnt a church, a hospital and ten houses. They also looted food and medical supplies.

References

2020 fires in Africa
2020 mass shootings in Africa
2020 murders in Nigeria
2020s in Borno State
Arson in Nigeria
Arson in the 2020s
Attacks in Nigeria in 2020
Attacks on buildings and structures in 2020 
Attacks on churches in Africa
Attacks on hospitals
Attacks on religious buildings and structures in Nigeria
Boko Haram kidnappings
December 2020 crimes in Africa
Islamic terrorist incidents in 2020
Islamist attacks on churches
Kidnapping in the 2020s
Looting in Africa
Mass murder in 2020
Mass murder in Borno State
Mass shootings in Nigeria
persecution of Christians by Muslims
Terrorist incidents in Borno State
Terrorist incidents in Nigeria in 2020